Heinecken is a surname of German origin. People with this name include:

 Robert Heinecken (1931–2006), American artist 
 Catharina Elisabeth Heinecken (1683–1757), German artist and alchemist
 Mickey Heinecken (b. 1939), former American football coach

See also
Heineken (surname)